Paul Copu (born 7 August 1953) is a Romanian former middle distance runner who competed in the 1980 Summer Olympics.

References

1953 births
Living people
Olympic athletes of Romania
Athletes (track and field) at the 1980 Summer Olympics
Romanian male middle-distance runners
Romanian male steeplechase runners
Universiade medalists in athletics (track and field)
Universiade gold medalists for Romania
Medalists at the 1979 Summer Universiade
Medalists at the 1977 Summer Universiade